Joffrey Nino Negawabloua Bazié (born 27 October 2003) is a Burkinabé professional footballer who plays as a forward for French club Lille reserve team and the Burkina Faso national team.

Club career
Bazié joined French Ligue 1 club Lille in January 2022.

International career
In March 2022, Bazié received his first call-up to Burkina Faso national team for friendly matches against Kosovo and Belgium. He made his international debut on 29 March 2022 in a 3–0 defeat against Belgium.

Career statistics

Club

International

References

External links
 

2003 births
Living people
Association football forwards
Burkinabé footballers
Burkina Faso international footballers
Salitas FC players
Lille OSC players
Burkinabé Premier League players
Championnat National 3 players
Burkinabé expatriate footballers
Burkinabé expatriate sportspeople in France
Expatriate footballers in France
Burkina Faso under-20 international footballers